Mario Carulla Schultz (born October 26, 1971) is a retired male badminton player from Peru, who won the bronze medal in the men's singles competition and another bronze medal in mixed with Adrienn Kocsis at the 1999 Pan American Games in Winnipeg, Canada. Also a bronze medal in men's singles at the 1995 Pan American Games in Mar del Plata, Argentina. He represented his native country at the 1996 Summer Olympics in Atlanta, USA.

References
  
  
  
  sports-reference

1971 births
Living people
Peruvian people of Italian descent
Peruvian people of German descent
Peruvian male badminton players
Badminton players at the 1996 Summer Olympics
Olympic badminton players of Peru
Place of birth missing (living people)
Badminton players at the 2003 Pan American Games
Badminton players at the 1999 Pan American Games
Badminton players at the 1995 Pan American Games
Pan American Games bronze medalists for Peru
Pan American Games medalists in badminton
Medalists at the 1995 Pan American Games
Medalists at the 1999 Pan American Games
21st-century Peruvian people